Fahreh may refer to:
Fahreh, Lorestan
Fahreh, Sistan and Baluchestan